European Parliament elections were held in Denmark between 7 and 10 June 1979 to elect the 15 Danish members of the European Parliament. Elections were held separately in Greenland to elect one Greenlandic member.

Results

References

Denmark
European Parliament elections in Denmark
Europe